Miguel La Fay Bardi, O. Carm., born Michael La Fay, (November 11, 1934 – October 20, 2021) was an American-born Roman Catholic prelate. La Fay Bardi served as the Prelate of the Territorial Prelature of Sicuani, now known as the present-day Roman Catholic Diocese of Sicuani in Sicuani, Peru, from July 26, 1999, until his retirement on July 10, 2013.

La Fay was born on November 11, 1934, in Chelsea, Massachusetts. He was ordained as a Carmelite Roman Catholic priest on July 4, 1960.

Bishop emeritus Miguel La Fay Bardi died on October 20, 2021, in Boston, Massachusetts, at the age of 86.

Honors
Gold Medal of Saint Toribio de Mogrovejo (Medalla de Oro de Santo Toribio de Mogrovejo) – Peru, 2011

References

1934 births
2021 deaths
Carmelite bishops
Roman Catholic bishops of Sicuani
Roman Catholic bishops in Peru
American Roman Catholic bishops by contiguous area of the United States
20th-century Roman Catholic bishops in Peru
21st-century Roman Catholic bishops in Peru
Bishops appointed by Pope John Paul II
People from Chelsea, Massachusetts
People from Cusco Region